A Presentation of Progressive Jazz is a 1948 jazz album by pianist and bandleader Stan Kenton.

Background
The album features performances recorded in 1947 and originally released on the Capitol label as four 78rpm discs, reissued as a 10-inch LP in 1953 as A Concert in Progressive Jazz, and then as a 12-inch LP in 1955 with additional tracks.

Track listing
All compositions by Pete Rugolo and Stan Kenton except where noted.
 "Cuban Carnival" (Pete Rugolo) – 2:44
 "Monotony" – 3:04
 "Lonely Woman" (Benny Carter, Ray Sonin) – 3:25
 "Lament" (Rugolo) – 3:03
 "Thermopolae" (Robert Graettinger) – 2:50 Additional track on 12-inch LP
 "Theme for Alto" (Rugolo) – 2:35 Additional track on 12-inch LP
 "Impressionism" (Rugolo) – 3:01
 "Elegy for Alto" – 3:10
 "This Is My Theme" (Rugolo, Kenton, Audrey Lacey) – 3:16
 "Fugue for Rhythm Section" (Rugolo) – 2:57
 "Introduction to a Latin Rhythm" – 2:41 Additional track on 12-inch LP
 "Come Rain or Come Shine" (Harold Arlen, Johnny Mercer) – 3:15 Additional track on 12-inch LP

Note
Recorded at Radio Recorders in Hollywood, CA on June 7, 1946 (track 12), September 24, 1947 (track 8), September 25, 1947 (track 10), October 20, 1947 (track 2), October 22, 1947 (tracks 4 & 7) and March 20, 1951 (track 6) and at RKO-Pathé Studios in New York City on December 6, 1947 (tracks 1, 3 & 5), December 21, 1947 (track 11) and December 22, 1947 (track 9)

Personnel
Stan Kenton – piano, conductor
Alfred "Chico" Alvarez, John Anderson (track 12), Buddy Childers (tracks 1–5 & 7–12), Maynard Ferguson (track 6), Ken Hanna (tracks 1–5 & 7–12), John Howell (track 6), Al Porcino (tracks 1–5 & 7–12), Shorty Rogers (track 6), Ray Wetzel – trumpet 
Milt Bernhart (tracks 1–11), Eddie Bert (tracks 1–5 & 7–11), Harry Betts (tracks 1–11), Bob Fitzpatrick (track 6), Harry Forbes (tracks 1–5 & 7–11), Milt Kabak (track 12), Dick Kenney (track 6), Miff Sines (track 12), Kai Winding (track 12) – trombone 
John Halliburton 9track 6), Bart Varsalona (tracks 1–5 & 7–12) – bass trombone
Al Anthony (track 12), Boots Mussulli (track 12), Frank Pappalardo (tracks 2, 8 & 10), Art Pepper (tracks 1, 3–7, 9 & 11), Bud Shank (track 6), George Weidler (tracks 1–5 & 7–11) – alto saxophone 
Bart Caldarell (track 6), Bob Cooper, Vido Musso (track 12), Warner Weidler (tracks 1–5 & 7–11) – tenor saxophone
Bob Gioga – baritone saxophone
Pete Rugolo – piano (track 12)
Laurindo Almeida (tracks 1–5 & 7–11) – guitar 
Don Bagley (track 6), Eddie Safranski (tracks 1–5 & 7–12) – bass 
Shelly Manne – drums
Jack Costanzo – bongos (tracks 1–5 & 7–11)
Carlos Vidal – congas (tracks 1 & 11)
José Mangual – timbales, cowbell (track 1)
Salvador Armenta (track 2), Machito (tracks 1 & 11), Rene Touzet (track 4) – maracas 
June Christy – vocals (tracks 3, 9 & 12)
Robert Graettinger (track 5), Pete Rugolo (tracks 1–4 & 6–12) – arranger

References

Stan Kenton albums
1948 albums
Capitol Records albums
Albums arranged by Pete Rugolo
Albums conducted by Stan Kenton